Ballard is a surname of English origin.  It likely derives from Middle English "ball," meaning "white spot," plus the suffix "-ard," and would therefore mean "bald head."  Indeed, Wyclif translated  2 Kings 2:23 as "Stye up, ballard," where Coverdale translated the same passage as "Come up here thou balde head."

There are other sources for this name, besides the Anglo-Saxon. Not all people bearing the name are of English origins. It is common, with native etymology among several Celtic nations, although the British Celtic form is likely the original, and it may be that "Bald head" is a false etymology designed to give the name English roots. The earliest form is Ap Alard, meaning the "son of the fox" in Welsh, and it passed from Wales to Brittany as Aballard, whence it became popular in France under the form Aballaird, and thence to Spain.

People with the surname Ballard

Arts, music, and writing
Agnes Ballard (1877–1969), American architect and educator
Alimi Ballard (born 1977), American actor 
Clint Ballard Jr. (1931–2008), American songwriter
Edward George Ballard (1791–1860) English miscellaneous writer 
Florence Ballard (1943–1976), American pop singer
Frank Ballard (1929–2010), American puppeteer
Frankie Ballard (born 1982), American country music singer
George Ballard (c. 1706 – 1755), English antiquary and biographer
Glen Ballard (born 1953), American songwriter and record producer 
Hank Ballard (1936–2003), American singer/songwriter
Horace D. Ballard (1984-), American writer and curator of the Williams College Museum of Art
J. G. Ballard (1930–2009), British writer 
Kaye Ballard (1925–2019), American actress, singer, and comedian 
Lucien Ballard (1908-1988), American cinematographer
Mary Canfield Ballard (1852–1927), American poet
Robert Ballard II (c. 1575–1645), French Baroque lutenist and composer 
Russ Ballard (born 1945), English singer/songwriter and musician 
Simone Ballard (1897-1978), French opera singer
Tom Ballard (born 1989), Australian comedian and radio presenter

Military and politics
Barbara Ballard (born 1944), American politician
Bland Ballard (1761–1853), American soldier and politician
 Charles Ballard (politician) (1836–1891), U.S. politician in Connecticut
Clinton B. Ballard (1840–1946), American politician
Colin Robert Ballard, (1868–1941), Brigadier-General in the British Army and military author
Donald E. Ballard (born 1945), American soldier
Don Ballard (1927–2019), American politician and lawyer
Edward J. Ballard (c. 1790–1813), American naval officer 
George Alexander Ballard (1862–1948), British naval officer
Greg Ballard (born 1954), American politician 
Jackie Ballard (born 1953), British politician and journalist 
John Archibald Ballard (1829–1880), British Lieutenant General
John S. Ballard (1922–2012), American politician 
Samuel James Ballard (1765–1829), Vice-Admiral in the Royal Navy 
Thomas Ballard (1630–1690), Virginia colonial politician 
Volant Vashon Ballard (c. 1774–1832), Rear-Admiral of the Royal Navy, Companion of the Bath

Science and medicine
Claudius Ballard (1890–1967), American physician 
Dana H. Ballard (born 1946), American computer scientist and vision researcher
Edward Ballard (1820–1897), English physician 
Geoffrey Ballard (1932–2008), Canadian geophysicist and entrepreneur
Guy Ballard (1878–1939), American mining engineer and Theosophist
Martha Ballard (c. 1734–1812), American midwife and diarist 
Robert Ballard (born 1942), American marine geologist and submarine explorer
Sarah Ballard (1983 or 1984–), astronomer

Sports
Charkey Ramon (born Dave Bruce Ballard in 1950), Australian boxer of the 1970s, and referee of the 1970s and '80s
Charles Ballard (active 1922-27), New Zealand footballer
Chris Ballard, American sports journalist
Del Ballard Jr. (born 1963), American professional bowler
Greg Ballard (basketball) (1955-2016), American basketball player
Jake Ballard (born 1987), American National Football League player
Jeff Ballard (born 1963), American Major League Baseball pitcher
Keith Ballard (born 1982), American ice hockey player
Tom Ballard (born 1988), British mountaineer
Daniel Ballard (born 1999) British professional footballer, Arsenal and Blackpool

Other
Adolphus Ballard (1867–1915), English historian 
Harold Ballard (1903–90), Canadian businessman
John Ballard (died 1586), English Jesuit priest and conspirator against Elizabeth I
M. Russell Ballard (born 1928), American businessman and Apostle of The Church of Jesus Christ of Latter-day Saints
Melvin J. Ballard (1873–1939), American Apostle of The Church of Jesus Christ of Latter-day Saints 
William Rankin Ballard (1847–1929), American banker and land developer

English-language surnames
Surnames of English origin